Hello Mister Whiskers is a children's music album by Franciscus Henri. It was released in 1997 under ABC Music's "ABC For Kids" children's label on compact disc. It was released in 1997 by ABC Music. It was nominated at the 1997 ARIA Music Awards for Best Children's Album but lost to Play School's In The Car.

Track listing
All songs written by Franciscus Henri unless otherwise noted. All arrangements by Franciscus Henri.
 "Hello Mister Whiskers"
 "Smiggy"
 "Mister Whiskers Plays on the Big Bass Drum" (Traditional)
 "I’m In the Mood" (Raffi)
 "Jig-A-Jog Jig" (Traditional)
 "I Had a Cat" (Traditional)
 "Giddy-Up Little Pony" (Traditional)
 "Knicky Knacky Knocky Noo" (Traditional)
 "Teddy Bears Bump"
 "My Toy Box"
 "Mister Sun"
 "Sunshine"
 "Five Little Ducks" (Traditional)
 "Animal Fair" (Traditional)
 "The Elephant" (Z R Mchenry)
 "The Monkey" (Z R Mchenry)
 "Donkey and I" (Traditional)
 "Clapping Land" (Traditional)
 "Over In the Meadow" (Traditional)
 "Donkey Don’t Cry"	
 "Bye, Bye Balloon"
 "I Am a Fine Musician" (Traditional)

1997 albums
Children's music albums
Franciscus Henri albums
1998 video albums